Blamires is a surname. Notable people by that name include:

 Harry Blamires (1916−2017), Anglican theologian.
 Henry Blamires (1871–1965), New Zealand first-class cricketer and clergyman.
 Steve Blamires (born 1955), researcher and historian in the field of Neopaganism, Celtic spirituality, and folklore.
 Edgar Percy Blamires (1878–1967), New Zealand Methodist minister.
 Emmanuel Blamires (1850–1886), English first-class cricketer.
 Ernest Blamires (1881–1963), New Zealand first-class cricketer and clergyman.